Bundesgrenzschutz (BGS) is the former name of the German Bundespolizei (Federal Police). Established on 16 March 1951 as a subordinate agency of the Federal Ministry of the Interior, the BGS originally was primarily focused on protecting the West German borders. During their early days, BGS units had military structures, training and equipment. The law enforcement officers legally had military combatant status until 1994. A major part of the early BGS personnel joined the newly founded German Armed Forces (Bundeswehr) in 1956 and thus significantly contributed to West Germany's rearmament. The BGS was renamed to Bundespolizei on 1 July 2005. The change of name did not have any effect on the legal status or competencies of the agency, but rather reflects its transition to a multi-faceted police agency with control over border, railway and air security.

History
The newly established Federal Republic of Germany wanted to set up its own federal border guard and police. The founding act of the Federal Border Guard (Bundesgrenzschutz, BGS) was adopted on 14 November 1950 by the federal cabinet and on 15 February 1951 by the Bundestag. The BGS was established on 16 March 1951.

The Cold War had begun, but travel between East and West Germany was not yet restricted by the Berlin Wall (1961). German nationals could move freely from the DDR to the BRD in Berlin, but people attempting to cross illegally elsewhere were likely to be either commercial smugglers or espionage agents carrying contraband (e.g., radio transmitters.). Occupation authorities judged this could be better policed by a permanent force of Germans who intimately knew the border woods and mountains (rather than British or US troops who rotated out of Germany after a year or two) and at German rather than Allied expense. The BGS was organized along paramilitary lines in battalions, companies, and platoons, and was armed as light infantry. It remained a police force controlled by the Ministry of Interior rather than by the Ministry of Defense.

A maritime border guard unit (Seegrenzschutz) was formed as part of the BGS on 1 July 1951. It consisted of approximately 550 members and was equipped with fourteen large patrol craft and several helicopters.

On 3 October 1953 the Bundespasskontrolldienst (passport control service), which had been established on 19 September 1951, was transferred to the BGS and was now deployed on the entire German border.

It eventually became the basis for the present national semi-militarised police force. On 19 June 1953 its authorized strength was expanded to 20,000 men, a mixture of conscripts and volunteers equipped with armoured cars, anti-tank guns, helicopters, trucks and jeeps. By 1956, it had a strength of 16,414 men. Upon the formation of the Bundeswehr in 1955, over 10,000 members of the BGS voluntarily joined the new German military in 1956. The Seegrenzschutz was completely absorbed into the German Navy that year. A new maritime border guard was set up in the fall of 1964 as the Bundesgrenzschutz See (BGS See).

Although it was not intended to be able to repel a full-scale invasion, the BGS was tasked with dealing with small-scale threats to the security of West Germany's borders, including the international borders as well as the inner German border. It had limited police powers within its zone of operations to enable it to deal with threats to the peace of the border. The BGS had a reputation for assertiveness which made it especially unpopular with East Germans, who routinely criticized it as a reincarnation of the Schutzstaffel from the days of Nazi Germany. It also sustained a long-running feud with the Bundeszollverwaltung over which agency should have the lead responsibility for the inner German border.<ref></cite>, pp. 96–97</ref>

The passing of the German Emergency Acts on 30 May 1968 relieved the BGS of its quasi-military tasks, because the Bundeswehr could now operate inside the Federal Republic in the case of an emergency. A military rank structure similar to that of the Bundeswehr was replaced in the mid-1970s by civil service-type personnel grades. The service uniform was green, but field units wore camouflage fatigues and, at times, steel helmets and military training was still carried out.

In 1972 the BGS became responsible for the security of the Federal Constitutional Court, the Bundespräsident (Federal President), the Bundeskanzler (Federal Chancellor), the Foreign Office and the Federal Ministry of the Interior. Although the Compulsory Border Guard Service law is still in force, in 1974 the BGS became an all volunteer force and in 1987 started recruiting women.

Among other things, it was equipped with armored cars, machine guns, automatic rifles, tear gas, hand grenades, rifle grenades, and antitank weapons. All personnel on border and security duty wore sidearms. Five units had light aircraft and helicopters to facilitate rapid access to remote border areas and for patrol and rescue missions. Some units were effectively Mountain troops because of their specialised training, equipment, and operational area (e.g., Bavarian Alps).

In addition to controlling Germany's border, the BGS Alert police served as a federal reserve force to deal with major disturbances and other emergencies beyond the scope of Land police. The BGS guarded airports and foreign embassies, and several highly trained detachments are available for special crisis situations requiring demolition equipment, helicopters, or combat vehicles.

Up to 1972 the BGS was organized in eight units known as Grenzschutzgruppen (Border Guard Units) GSG-1 to GSG-8. After shortcomings in police procedures and training were revealed by the terrorist attack on Israeli athletes at the 1972 Summer Olympics, a BGS task force known as Grenzschutzgruppe 9 (GSG-9) was formed to deal with terrorist incidents, especially hostage situations. The GSG-9 won world attention when it rescued eighty-six passengers on a Lufthansa Flight 181 airliner which was hijacked to Mogadishu, Somalia, in 1977.

June 1990 saw the elimination of border patrols and control of persons at the Inner-German border. Upon German reunification on 3 October 1990, the East German Transportpolizei duties, and responsibility for air security in the new federal states, were taken over by the BGS. The German Railway Police (Bahnpolizei), formerly an independent force, was restructured under the BGS on 1 April 1992 in preparation for the railway's privatization. The (formerly federally run) railway system remains a federal competency and Länder police forces have no authority over the railways. 

The strength of the BGS was 24,000 in early 1995.

Notable personnel
 Anton Grasser
 Kurt Andersen (general)
 Ulrich Wegener
 Michael Newrzella

Gallery

See also 
 Allied-occupied Germany
 Bavarian Border Police
 B-Gendarmerie
 Border guards of the inner German border
 British Frontier Service
 Bundeszollverwaltung (Federal Customs Service)
 Crossing the inner German border
 Development of the inner German border
 Escape attempts and victims of the inner German border
 Fall of the inner German border
 Fortifications of the inner German border
 Grepo
 Helmstedt–Marienborn border crossing (Checkpoint Alpha)
 United States Zone Constabulary
 Volkspolizei-Bereitschaft (East German Riot Police)
 East German border guards

References

External links

BPOL History site
Bundespolizei home page (in German)
Information brochure about the Bundespolizei (in German and English) last updated August 2005

 German language pages on the BGS
 (in German) - You can see the old Bundesgrenzschutz in historic pictures and films and you can listen songs of the Bundesgrenzschutz
 BPOL BGS History page
 http://www.beim-alten-bgs.de
 http://www.bgs-erinnerung.de
 http://www.grenzstreife.de
 Die Mowag-Sonderwagen des BGS

Defunct law enforcement agencies of Germany
Border guards
Paramilitary organisations based in Germany
German Mountain Troops
Borders of East Germany
Inner German border
1951 establishments in West Germany